Floyd Elmo Newkirk (July 16, 1908 – April 15, 1976) nicknamed "Three-Fingers" was a Major League Baseball pitcher. In one career game, he had a 0–0 record, with a 0.00 ERA, pitching in only 1 inning. He batted and threw right-handed.

He attended Illinois College. He was also a World War II veteran. Newkirk was the brother of Major Leaguer Joel Newkirk.

Newkirk was born in Norris City, White County, Illinois; died in Clayton, Missouri; and was buried in Jefferson Barracks National Cemetery in St. Louis County, Missouri.

References

External links

1908 births
1976 deaths
Illinois College Blueboys baseball players
New York Yankees players
Major League Baseball pitchers
Baseball players from Illinois
People from White County, Illinois
United States Army personnel of World War II
United States Army soldiers